Naismith is an unincorporated community in Toole County, Montana, United States, located approximately  north of Great Falls.

References

Unincorporated communities in Toole County, Montana
Unincorporated communities in Montana